The International Society for the Study of Trauma and Dissociation (ISSTD) is a nonprofit professional organization of health professionals and individuals who are interested in advancing the scientific and societal understandings of trauma-based disorders, including posttraumatic stress disorder, complex posttraumatic stress disorder, and the dissociative disorders.

Profile
The focus of the organization has broadened over the years. In the 1980s, the ISSMP&D, the International Society for the Study of Multiple Personality and Dissociation, grouped clinicians and researchers primarily interested in Multiple Personality Disorder (MPD). Dissociative Identity Disorder (DID) had been called MPD since the 19th century, and was still called MPD in DSM-II and DSM-III. In the 1990s, DSM-IV changed the name of MPD to DID, and so the ISSMP&D simplified its name to the ISSD (the International Society for the Study of Dissociation), broadening its interest to include the other dissociative disorders. By the 21st century, the ISSD had broadened its interest to include chronic developmental traumatic disorders (also known as Complex PTSD), and so the name was lengthened to ISSTD: the International Society for the Study of Trauma and Dissociation. Editors of the book Dissociation and the dissociative disorders: DSM-V and beyond describe the ISSTD as "The principle professional organization devoted to dissociation".

The ISSTD has published guidelines for the treatment of dissociative identity disorder in both adults and children through its peer-reviewed Journal of Trauma & Dissociation (formerly Dissociation: Progress in the Dissociative Disorders), published five times per year. These guidelines are often referenced in the field as a basic starting point for psychotherapy with highly dissociative clients.

The ISSMP&D's official journal, Dissociation: Progress in the Dissociative Disorders ceased operation after 39 issues (March 1988-December 1997), though its full-text contents have since been made available online.

Controversies

In the 1990s, controversies surrounding repressed memory and the possible connections between child abuse, traumatic events, memory and dissociation arose.

Some mental health professionals who used hypnosis and other memory recovery techniques now known to contribute to the creation of false memories found their patients lodging bizarre accusations - including of satanic ritual abuse, sacrificial murder, and cannibalism - against their parents, family members and prominent community members. This era is now considered a moral panic, typically referred to as the “Satanic Panic.”

After years of controversy, between 1993 and 1998, the ISSTD entered what 1999 president Peter Barach called a “crisis”. Between 1993 and 1998 the organization lost almost half its membership, about fifteen hundred people. In 1998, the society’s journal, Dissociation, ceased publication. By 1999 staff was being let go.

The organization offered to integrate itself into the International Society for Traumatic Stress Studies, a group to which a number of ISSTD, then ISSD members, interested in trauma, but no longer interested in multiple personality, had switched their allegiance. “Unfortunately,” Barach reports, “the ISTSS did not accept the proposal.”

The ISSTD has been accused by groups such as The False Memory Syndrome Foundation and The Satanic Temple of propagating Satanic Panic-era conspiracy theories.

In 1988, one of the ISSMP&D founders Bennett Braun presented a workshop in Chicago at an ISSMP&D conference linking the diagnosis of multiple personality disorder (now dissociative identity disorder) to abuse at the hands of devil-worshipping cults. His arguments included unfounded claims of widespread Satanic cults, internally organized with a structure similar to communist cells, with local regional, distinct, national and international councils. Braun also presented bizarre claims that the cults were transgenerational family traditions that had been conducted in secret for at least 2000 years. Braun has challenged these claims, alleging that they rely on remarks taken out of context which misrepresent his actual views.

In 1994, ISSTD past president George Greaves' license was revoked by the state of Georgia for engaging in sexual intercourse with patients, sexual contact with his patients while they were under hypnosis, and numerous other ethical violations.

In 1995, ISSTD's founder and former president, Bennett Braun, was sued by a former patient who claimed that Braun had falsely convinced her that she'd engaged in Satanic rituals, cannibalism, and infanticide. The patient received a $10.6 million settlement. Braun's medical license was temporarily suspended by Illinois state officials in 1999.

In 2004, another former patient of Braun’s, Elizabeth Gale, filed a lawsuit against Braun and Roberta Sachs, another ISSTD founder, alleging that they and their colleagues convinced Gale “that her family indoctrinated her as a child so she would make babies for sacrifice in a satanic cult.” The settlement in the malpractice suit amounted to $7.5 million.

Another ISSTD founder, Richard Kluft, wrote in 2014, “[I]t is undeniable that satanic elements are employed at times by those who wish to exploit the power of such materials for the purposes of intimidation and/or to pursue nefarious purposes. [...] Satanic elements remain problematic realities in many situations. I remain troubled about the matter of transgenerational satanic cults.”

Former ISSTD president Colin Ross has also been accused by former patients of implanting false memories, including of satanic ritual abuse. Roma Hart accused Ross of convincing her, among other things, that she was forcibly impregnated by aliens and later gave birth to a half-alien, half-human hybrid. Another former patient, Martha Ann Tyo, sued Ross and others in 1998, alleging that the defendants’ methods led her to believe her family was part of an “extended, transgenerational satanic cult.”

In October 2020, the ISSTD Board of Directors issued a letter to membership informing them that the special interest group formerly known as RAMCOA SIG (Ritual Abuse, Mind Control and Organized Abuse Special Interest Group) had been renamed due to “stricter rules for the provision of Continuing Education (CE) and Continuing Medical Education (CME) credits”, largely due to growing concerns about the organization’s presentations which included sensationalized and controversial statements regarding “mind control.”

In January 2021, former ISSTD president Bennett Braun's license was revoked an additional time by the state of Montana in addition to the previous revocations from the state of Illinois.

History
The US-based ISSTD was officially formed in 1984 under the name of the International Society for the Study of Multiple Personality and Dissociation but changed to the International Society for the Study of Dissociation in 1994 and then to its current name in November 2006.

The organization was resolved to be founded by Myron Boor, Bennett Braun, David Caul, Jane Dubrow, George Greaves, Richard Kluft, Frank Putnam and Roberta Sachs, a group of physicians and psychologists. Its first annual conference was held in December of the same year. By the end of the 1980s, membership approached 2,000.

Presidents
George. B. Greaves (1983–1984)
Bennet Braun (1984–1985)
Richard Kluft (1985–1986)
George. B. Greaves (1986–1987)
David Caul (1987–1988)
Philip Coons (1988–1989)
Walter C. Young (1989–1990)
Catherine Fine (1990–1991)
Richard Loewenstein (1991–1992)
Moshe S. Torem (1992–1993)
Colin A. Ross (1993–1994)
Nancy L. Hornstein (1994–1995)
Elizabeth S. Bowman (1995–1996)
James, A. Chu (1996–1997)
Marlene E. Hunter (1997–1998)
Peter M. Barach (1998–1999)
John Curtis (1999–2000)
Joy Silberg (2000–2001)
Steven Frankel (2001–2002)
Richard A. Chefetz (2002–2003)
Steven Gold (2003–2004)
Frances S. Waters (2004–2005)
Eli Somer (2005–2006)
Catherine Classen (2006–2007)
Vedat Şar (2007–2008)
Kathy Steele (2008–2009)
Paul F. Dell (2010–2011)
Thomas G. Carlton (2011–2012)
Joan Turkus (2012–2013)
Philip J. Kinsler (2013–2014) 
Lynette S. Danylchuk (2015) 
Warwick Middleton (2016) 
Martin Dorahy (2017)
Kevin Connors (2018)
Christine Forner (2019)
Christa Krüger (2020)

See also

 American Psychiatric Association
 Depersonalization
 Dissociative Experiences Scale
 DSM-5
 Trauma model of mental disorders

References

Citations

Sources

External links
 
 Dissociation: Progress in the Dissociative Disorders archive at Scholars' Bank, University of Oregon
 The Bennet Braun Story

Dissociative disorders
Psychology organizations based in the United States
Mental health organizations in Virginia